BLEND (formerly: One Hour Translation) is a localization and translation services company headquartered in Tel Aviv, Israel. The company was founded as One Hour Translation in 2008 by Yaron Kaufman, Lior Libman and Oren Yagev. 
BLEND provides machine translation and AI-based localization services for enterprise companies, as well as offering a self-service online translation platform, BLEND Express.
BLEND has offices in Tel Aviv, Bucharest, Kyiv, Atlanta, Los Angeles, Shanghai, Hong Kong, and London.

History
One Hour Translation was founded in Israel in 2008 as an online translation company.

In January 2014 the company raised a $10M funding round from Fortissimo Capital.

In March 2021, the company underwent a rebranding and changed its name to BLEND, while also closing its series B funding round with Fortissimo Capital of $10 million.

In June 2021, BLEND acquired GM Voices, an Atlanta based voice services company.

Recognition
 2021 – Ranked #16 in the Asia-Pacific region in CSA Research's rankings of the largest LSPs by region
 2021 – Ranked in the Slator Language Service Provider Index

References

External links
 BLEND homepage

Translation companies
Organizations established in 2008